Stuhleck (1,782 m) is a mountain in Steiermark, Austria. It is the highest mountain of the Fischbach Alps and of the Prealps east of the Mur.

Lying in the sparsely populated commune of Spital am Semmering, Stuhleck is a grassy mountain with gentle slopes, although its lower slopes are heavily wooded. With the summit being above the treeline, it offers fine views of some of the higher alpine ranges to the west, and it is a fairly easy hike to the top.

References

Mountains of the Alps
Mountains of Styria
Fischbach Alps